Étienne Wolff (Auxerre, 12 February 1904 – Paris, 18 November 1996) was a French biologist, specialising in experimental and teratological embryology. He led the  Société zoologique de France from 1958 and was elected to the French Academy of Sciences in 1963.

Personal life
He was educated at the Lycée Pierre-Corneille in Rouen. 

Wolff was an advocate of animal rights. He was President of the French League for Animal Rights (1984-1986).

Works
Thèses présentées à la Faculté des sciences de l'Université de Strasbourg pour obtenir le grade de docteur ès-sciences naturelles. 1re thèse : Les Bases de la tératogénèse expérimentale des vertébrés amniotes d'après les résultats de méthodes directes. 2e thèse : L'Évolution après l'éclosion des poulets mâles transformés en intersexués par l'hormone femelle injectée aux jeunes embryons (1936)
Les Changements de sexe (1946)La Science des monstres (1948)Les Chemins de la vie (1963)The Living Organism (1965)La poésie funéraire épigraphique à Rome (1971)Les Pancrates, nos nouveaux maîtres (1975)Dialogues avec mes animaux familiers (1979)Trois pattes pour un canard'' (1990)

References

External links
Académie française

1904 births
1996 deaths
20th-century French biologists
French animal rights activists
French embryologists
French people of German descent
Lycée Pierre-Corneille alumni
Members of the French Academy of Sciences
People from Auxerre
Members of the Royal Swedish Academy of Sciences